Taocheng District is district of Hengshui, Hebei province, China.

History 
In the 1930s, Taocheng was home to a branch of the Yellow Sand Society which reorganised itself as "People's Anti-Japanese National Salvation Self-Defence Corps", fighting against the expansion of the Empire of Japan in the area.

Administrative divisions

Subdistricts:
Hexi Subdistrict, Hedong Subdistrict, Lubei Subdistrict, Zhonghua Subdistrict

Towns:
Zhengjiaheyan, Zhaoquan

Townships:
Hejiazhuang Township, Damasen Township, Dengzhuang Township, Pengducun Township

References

Bibliography

External links

County-level divisions of Hebei